Mochitlán  is a city and seat of the municipality of Mochitlán, in the state of Guerrero, south-western Mexico.

Previously it was called Nochistlán, which in Nahuatl means "Royal Paradise", a name that was changed to Mochitlán.

References

Populated places in Guerrero